Jordan Robson-Cramer is a Canadian  multi-instrumentalist musician based in Montreal, Quebec. He was the founder and front man of the band Magic Weapon, and former member of the bands Miracle Fortress and Sunset Rubdown.

Early life and education
Robson-Cramer was born in Winnipeg, Manitoba, and grew up in Victoria, British Columbia, where he graduated from high school.

Career
Robson-Cramer moved to Montreal in 2004. The indie rock band Magic Weapon was formed in 2005 when Robson-Cramer joined forces with Mathieu Malouf. Robson-Cramer, a fellow member of the band Miracle Fortress. A self-titled EP Magic Weapon was recorded and released in October 2006.  Malouf left the band later that year; Matt Shane of Think About Life became Magic Weapon's drummer, and Rory Seydel of Shapes and Sizes joined on guitar in 2007. At this point all of the members were former Victorians who had moved to Montreal. They recorded Residue Hymns at Breakglass Studios in Montreal with Dave Smith.  The band perform in Toronto that year.

When Graham Van Pelt expanded his solo project Miracle Fortress into a band in order to perform live shows, Robson-Cramer became the band's drummer. The band made a cross-Canada tour in 2007. In 2006 Robson-Cramer became drummer, guitarist and keyboardist for Montreal's Sunset Rubdown; He recorded with the band on their album Shut up, I'm Dreaming and on 2007's Random Spirit Lover.

Robson-Cramer left Miracle Fortress in early 2008.

Not long after the release of Residue Hymns, Jordan Robson-Cramer disbanded Magic Weapon. He remained the touring drummer for Sunset Rubdown until it disbanded in late 2009. Robson-Cramer went on to start a new project called Ancient Kids, through which he released an 8-track EP entitled 'Odd City' in January 2011.

Affiliated musicians
 Jordan Robson-Cramer: keyboard, guitar, vocals
 Rory Seydel: guitar
 Matt Shane: drums

Discography
 Magic Weapon EP (2006) self-released
 Residue Hymns EP (2007) self-released

References

External links
 Magic Weapon Official Website
 CBC Radio3 Interview, November 2007  http://radio3.cbc.ca/blogs/2007/11/In-Conversation-Jordan-Robson-Cramer
 Exclaim Magazine Review, November 2007  http://www.exclaim.ca/articles/generalarticlesynopsfullart.aspx?csid1=116&csid2=804&fid1=28615

Canadian indie rock musicians
Living people
Year of birth missing (living people)